An iSCSI target is a storage resource located on an iSCSI server (more generally, one of potentially many instances of iSCSI storage nodes running on that server) as a "target". An iSCSI target usually represents hard disk storage, often accessed using an Ethernet-based network.

Comparison chart
Software packages are available to allow a customer to configure a computer with disk drives and a network interface to be an iSCSI target.

References

ISCSI targets 
Storage software
Storage virtualization